Bale Pandiya is a 2010 Tamil action comedy film written and directed by Siddharth Chandrasekhar. It stars Vishnu Vishal and Piaa Bajpai in the lead roles. The film was released on 3 September 2010 with mixed reviews. The movie is based on the 1990 movie I Hired a Contract Killer.

Plot
Contract killer AKP (R. Amarendran) and his two sidekicks (one of which is a driver that does a full 360-degree flip from the car window and opens the door, allowing AKP to exit from the passenger seat) arrive at a club. The group walks into the club and starts showing their power before reaching their table. A finger with a ring is placed on the table. Pandian (Vishnu Vishal) considers himself unlucky. All his efforts to come up in life end on the wrong side. He approaches AKP and urges to kill him. A shocked AKP is initially hesitant. Soon, he decides to give him some time. Hence, he gives Pandian some money and entrusts him with the job of turning a human bomb, a job that he should execute within 20 days. Life changes for Pandian after he meets Vaishnavi (Piaa Bajpai). They fall in love with each other. When Pandian decides to go tell AKP that he would rather prefer to live, he gets a rude shock: AKP and his men are found murdered. The blame falls on Pandian. Meanwhile, Vaishnavi gets kidnapped by a gang for a big deal. It is chaos and confusion everywhere, before Pandian sets things right.

Cast

Vishnu Vishal as Pandiya
Piaa Bajpai as Vaishnavi
R. Amarendran as AKP
Vivek as London
Gibran Osman as Kachitham
Appukutty as Kachitham's assistant
John Vijay as Pasupathy 
Jayaprakash as Vannaiyar
Dr. Sharmila as Pandiya's mother
Gadam Kishan as Raju
Vijay Sethupathi as Pandiya's brother 
Pandu
Vaiyapuri
Aarthi
Nellai Siva
Cell Murugan as Thirupathi

Guest appearances in Happy song by: (in alphabetical order)

Aalap Raju
Anuradha Sriram
Devan Ekambaram
Divya Vijay
Haricharan
Japan Kumar
K. J. Yesudas
Malaysia Vasudevan
Malgudi Subha
Manikka Vinayagam
Megha
Mukesh Mohamed
Naresh Iyer
Naveen Madhav
Paravai Muniyamma
Rahul Nambiar
Ranjith
Raqueeb Alam
S. P. Balasubrahmanyam
Shaan Rahman
Srinivas
Suchitra
Sundar
Swetha Mohan
Velmurugan
Vijay Yesudas

Production
The film marked the directorial debut of leading advertising designer Siddharth Chandrasekhar. The filming was held at Phuket, Pondicherry and Chennai. The song "Happy" featured 20 playback singers in cameo appearances.

Soundtrack
Songs composed by Devan Ekambaram. The song "Happy" is based on "Happy Indru Mudhal" from Ooty Varai Uravu (1967).

Critical reception
Behindwoods rated the film 2 out of 5 and mentioned "The attempts of director Siddharth appear fresh and there are touches of his ad world experience in a few scenes. [..] However, Siddharth has not held the screen play tightly through out and loses his grasp especially towards the end. The film seems to drag on with a meandering narration in the latter half". Rediff wrote "Sidharth Chandrasekar's debut film hits the right note at certain places, and it certainly has its funny moments. If it had sustained that momentum in the second half, Bale Pandiya would have been even better". Sify mentioned that "The trouble with Bale Pandiya is that the director just do not know whether to make a spoof or a comedy with songs and action, in the process he falls between two stools" and called it "half baked and contrived".

See also
 Bale Pandiya (1962 film), an unrelated film starring Sivaji Ganesan

References

External links
 

2010 films
2010s Tamil-language films
Indian action comedy films
2010 action comedy films
2010 directorial debut films
2010 comedy films